Dexter Russell Wright (June 27, 1821 – July 23, 1886) was an American lawyer and politician.

Wright, born in Windsor, Vermont, June 27, 1821, the son of Alpheus and Anna E. (Loveland) Wright.  During his boyhood, the family removed to the northern part of New York State, and in 1843 he entered the Junior Class of Wesleyan University, at Middletown, Conn., from Heuvelton, St. Lawrence County.

He was graduated in 1845, and then taught for a year in Meriden, Conn., after which he attended for two years the courses in the Yale Law School.  On taking his degree in law in 1848, he opened an office in Meriden, and the next year (1849) began his political career by his election at an unusually early age to the Connecticut State Senate.  After serving for one term he sailed for California, where he spent two years, engaged in the practice of law and in land speculation. He then returned to Meriden, and followed his profession with success until 1862, when he enlisted in the Union Army.  He served as Colonel of the 15th Regiment State Volunteers, from July, 1862, until February, 1863, when his health failed and he was honorably discharged.

In 1863 he was a member of the Lower House in the Connecticut Legislature, and from 1863 to 1865 he served as a commissioner on the Board of Enrollment for the 2nd Congressional District. In 1864 he resumed the practice of law, establishing his office in New Haven, and achieving marked success. He was Assistant U. S. District Attorney from 1865 to 1869, and subsequently held a variety of important positions in connection with the city government. He was sent as a Representative to the General Assembly in 1879, and was chosen Speaker of the House.

In the spring of 1886 he met with a severe fall on the steps of his residence, causing a shock to his entire system, from which he only partially recovered. On June 19 he was stricken with paralysis which resulted in his death, in New Haven, July 23, 1886, at the age of 65.

He married, February 3, 1848, Maria H., daughter of Col.  Epaphras L. Phelps, of East Windsor, Conn., who survived him, with two daughters and two sons; the younger son graduated Yale in 1882.

External links 
 

1821 births
1886 deaths
Politicians from Meriden, Connecticut
Lawyers from New Haven, Connecticut
People of Connecticut in the American Civil War
People from Windsor County, Vermont
Wesleyan University alumni
Yale Law School alumni
Connecticut state senators
Members of the Connecticut House of Representatives
Speakers of the Connecticut House of Representatives
Connecticut lawyers
California lawyers
Connecticut local politicians
Union Army colonels
19th-century American politicians
Politicians from New Haven, Connecticut
19th-century American lawyers